This is a list of locks and dams of the Ohio River, which begins at the confluence of the Allegheny and Monongahela rivers at The Point in Pittsburgh, Pennsylvania and ends at the confluence of the Ohio River and the Mississippi River, in Cairo, Illinois.

Evolution of navigation on the Ohio River
In the early days of steamboat navigation on the Ohio River the major physical hurdle that delayed travel was the Falls of the Ohio near Louisville, Kentucky. Steamboats could only maneuver over the falls during times of high water, which were not consistent. It was more practical for the steamboats to drop off passengers and freight on one end of the falls and transport them over land to the opposite end of the falls to another steamboat. This resulted in Louisville becoming a customary last stop for vessels on both legs of the Ohio. If a steamboat desired to travel unimpeded through the falls without waiting for high water, a canal and lock system was needed in order to circumvent the falls.

In 1825, construction began on that canal, and by 1830 the privately financed Louisville and Portland Canal was finished. The canal was constructed by hand tools with the help of animal-drawn scrappers and carts. The completed canal was two miles long with three locking chambers that created a total lift of 26 feet.

Canalization
The amount of coal transported down river from Pittsburgh jumped greatly following the Civil War. The size of the tows also grew with the amount of coal hauled. Due to the escalating coal trade, the US Army Corps of Engineers began studying methods to produce a reliable navigation depth on the Ohio. The Corps launched an international study to analyze other navigation projects worldwide. They determined that building a system of locks and dams to form pools was the best solution to the problem.

Following the opening of the lock and dam at Davis Island in 1885, the venture proved to be worthy. In 1910, the Rivers and Harbors Act was authorized by Congress. The Act allowed the production of a system of locks and dams along the Ohio. In 1929, the canalization project on the Ohio River was finished. The project produced 51 wooden wicket dams and 600 foot by 110 foot lock chambers along the length of the river.

During the 1940s, a shift from steam propelled to diesel powered towboats allowed for tows longer than the 600 foot locks on the river. This meant barges had to be locked in two phases. This operation was dangerous and time-consuming. It backed up river traffic and increased expenses for the towing industry. The Corps initiated the Ohio River Navigation Modernization Program in the 1950s. The program's purpose was to replace the system of outdated wicket dams and small locks. The new dams were non-navigable and made of concrete and steel. Each dam has two adjoining locks, one 600-foot by 110-foot chamber, and a 1,200-foot by 110-foot chamber to accommodate fifteen barges that can lock through in one maneuver.

Key

Downstream, Pittsburgh to Olmsted

Footnotes
Locations may be the nearest city or town to the locks and dam and not their actual geographical location.

See also

List of crossings of the Ohio River
List of locks and dams of the Upper Mississippi River
United States Army Corps of Engineers

References
General

 
 
 
 

Specific

External links
U.S. Army Corps of Engineers, Pittsburgh District
U.S. Army Corps of Engineers, Huntington District
U.S. Army Corps of Engineers, Louisville District

Ohio
Lists of buildings and structures in Ohio
Lists of buildings and structures in Kentucky
Lists of buildings and structures in Pennsylvania
Lists of buildings and structures in Indiana
Lists of buildings and structures in Illinois
Lists of buildings and structures in West Virginia